AEL FC Arena is a football stadium in Larissa, Greece, with a current seating capacity of 16,118. Since its completion in 2010 and for 8 seasons, it has been the home ground of AΕL. Owner of the ground is Gipedo Larissa A.E.

The stadium was developed in a total of 144,000 square meters in the Mezourlo Hill, district of Neapolis, Larissa. Construction of the stadium started in September 2009 and was completed in November 2010. According to UEFA stadium categories, AEL FC Arena is rated as category  three of four, (renamed from elite) in ascending ranking order.

The seating capacity is 16,118 all covered, with the possibility to expand to 18,000. It also includes 38 VIP boxes, for 12 spectators each. The stadium complex, called Crimson Park, includes parking lots for 1,104 vehicles, commercial spaces, a movie theater, and a 1,500-seat open-air theater, 12 tennis courts and lies near the Neapolis Indoor Hall. The new sports venue is ideally located - regarding the urban location - with a fair accession in the transport system and has good accessibility from two main motorways and proximity to the city's center.

The stadium was inaugurated on 23 November, followed by a concert by Filippos Pliatsikas (himself a fan of the team) and Dionysis Tsaknis.

History
The first football match at AEL FC Arena took place on December 5, 2010 in the framework of its 13th Super League game 2010–11, in the match between AEL FC and PAOK FC, which ended with a score of 1–2. The first goal scored on the field came at 11' by PAOK's Chilean footballer, Pablo Contreras.

Gallery

References

External links

AEL FC Arena at AEL's official website 
AEL FC Arena project page 

Football venues in Greece
Athlitiki Enosi Larissa F.C.
Buildings and structures in Larissa